Carphephorus tomentosus, the woolly chaffhead, is a species of North American plants in the family Asteraceae. They are native to the southeastern United States in the states of Virginia, Georgia, North Carolina, and South Carolina.

Carphephorus tomentosus is an herb up to 80 cm (32 inches) tall, covered with many hairs resembling wool. It produces a flat-topped inflorescence with many small purplish flower heads containing disc florets but no ray florets.

References

External links
North Carolina Wildflowers, Shrubs, & Trees
Alabama Plants

Eupatorieae
Plants described in 1803
Flora of the Southeastern United States
Flora without expected TNC conservation status